Lennart Westermark (born 15 June 1965) is a Swedish bobsledder. He competed in the four man event at the 1994 Winter Olympics.

References

1965 births
Living people
Swedish male bobsledders
Olympic bobsledders of Sweden
Bobsledders at the 1994 Winter Olympics
Sportspeople from Stockholm